St Giles' Church is an active parish church in the village of Stoke Poges, Buckinghamshire, England. A Grade I listed building, it stands in the grounds of Stoke Park, a late-Georgian mansion built by John Penn. It is famous as the apparent inspiration for Thomas Gray's poem Elegy Written in a Country Churchyard; Gray is buried in the churchyard.

History and architecture

The origins of the church are Anglo-Saxon and Norman. The tower dates from the 13th century. The adjacent Hastings chapel was constructed in 1558 by Edward Hastings, 1st Baron Hastings of Loughborough, owner of the manor of Stoke Poges, who also undertook a substantial enlargement of the neighbouring manor house.

St Giles comprises a "battlemented" tower, a nave, a chancel and the Hastings Chapel. The church is built mainly of flint and chalk stone, with tiled roofs. The exception is the Hastings Chapel which is constructed of red brick. The style of the chapel is later than the Gothic of the church; Simon Jenkins, the writer and former chairman of the National Trust, describes it as "Tudor". The church has extensions to either side, a vestry of the early 20th century, and an entrance and vestibule installed in the Victorian period to provide private access to the church for the owners of the adjacent manor house. Elizabeth Williamson, in the 2003 revised edition, Buckinghamshire, of the Pevsner Buildings of England series, considered the Victorian porch an "excrescence".

During the Victorian era, a restoration was carried out by George Edmund Street. Jenkins, in his volume England's Thousand Best Churches, thought that the exterior was treated more sympathetically than the interior. Of the latter, he describes the removal of the plasterwork in the nave, together with the replacement of the Norman chancel arch and the opening up of the hammerbeam roof, as giving the church the appearance of "a barn".

St Giles remains an active parish church in the Church of England, administered as part of the Diocese of Oxford. The churchyard has been used as a filming location. In the opening sequence of the James Bond movie, For Your Eyes Only, Bond enters the churchyard through the lychgate to pay his respects at the grave of his wife, Teresa. The churchyard also features in Judy Garland's final film, I Could Go On Singing.

Adjacent to the church are the Stoke Poges Memorial Gardens, founded in 1935 by Sir Noel Mobbs to ensure "the maintenance in perpetuity of the peace, quietness and beauty of the ancient church and churchyard". The gardens were landscaped by Edward White and contain a number of private plots for the interment of ashes, within a larger, Grade I listed park. The ashes of the film director Alexander Korda and the broadcaster Kenneth Horne, among others, are interred in the garden.

St Giles is a Grade I listed building. Gray's tomb is designated Grade II. The Gray Monument (adjacent to St Giles' church and owned by the National Trust) is listed at Grade II*. The lychgate is by John Oldrid Scott and is a Grade II listed structure.

Thomas Gray and Elegy Written in a Country Churchyard 

Thomas Gray was a regular visitor to Stoke Poges, which was home to his mother and an aunt,
and the churchyard at St Giles is reputed to have been the inspiration for his Elegy Written in a Country Churchyard, though this is not universally accepted.
Some scholars suggest that much, or all, of the poem was written in Cambridge, where Gray lived.
Other commentators have identified as alternative possibilities St Mary's, Everdon, Northamptonshire; and St Laurence's Church, Upton-cum-Chalvey, Berkshire.
The poem certainly had a long gestation,
but it was completed at Stoke Poges in 1750. In June of that year, Gray wrote to his friend and supporter, Horace Walpole; "I have been here at Stoke a few days and having put an end to a thing, whose beginning you have seen long ago, I immediately send it to you."
 writes that there is "no doubt" about the identification of St. Giles as the churchyard of Gray's Elegy, and Robert L. Mack calls it "very close to irrefutable".

In 1771 Gray was buried (in accordance with his instructions) in the churchyard, in the vault erected for his mother and aunt.
The tomb above records the names, ages and dates of death of Gray's mother and aunt, and his own tribute to his mother ("the careful tender mother of many children, one of whom alone had the misfortune to survive her") but no reference to Gray himself. Instead, his death and burial are recorded on a plaque set into the adjacent, external wall of the Hastings Chapel.

Gray's Monument, a sarcophagus set on a pedestal inscribed with stanzas from the Elegy, was commissioned by John Penn as a memorial to Gray himself, as a tribute to the Elegy, and as an eye-catcher for Penn’s Stoke Park estate.

Gallery

References

Sources

External links

Guide to the church

12th-century church buildings in England
Grade I listed churches in Buckinghamshire
Churches in Buckinghamshire